Weightlifting was contested from May 25 to May 28 at the 1958 Asian Games in Tokyo Main Stadium Gymnasium, Tokyo, Japan. The competition included only men's events for eight different weight categories.

Iran finished first at the medal table by winning three gold medals.

Schedule

Medalists

Medal table

Participating nations
A total of 60 athletes from 11 nations competed in weightlifting at the 1958 Asian Games:

References
 Results

External links
 Weightlifting Database

 
1958 Asian Games events
1958
Asian Games
1958 Asian Games